Crymocetus is an extinct genus of plesiosaur from the Cretaceous Chalk Group of Sussex, England. Since its description, it has been seldom examined by subsequent authors, except when mentioned in discussions of Cretaceous plesiosaurs

Taxonomy

Crymocetus was originally described as the new species Plesiosaurus bernardi by the legendary British paleontologist Sir Richard Owen in 1850. Its type specimen consisted of a large posterior cervical vertebra found in Cretaceous-aged chalk deposits in Sussex, England. However, the famous American paleontologist Edward Drinker Cope decided that P. bernardi warranted its own genus, which he named Crymocetus.

Despite Cope's action, nearly all authors tended to disregard Cope's generic name. Crymocetus was considered a species of Cimoliasaurus by Richard Lydekker, with Plesiosaurus ichthyospondylus and tentatively Plesiosaurus balticus as synonyms. Later authors considered Crymocetus to be either a pliosaur or a rhomaleosaurid. In any case, Crymocetus is in need of restudy along with other plesiosaurs from Middle Cretaceous deposits in the UK.

See also
 Timeline of plesiosaur research

 List of plesiosaurs

References

Late Cretaceous plesiosaurs of Europe
Fossil taxa described in 1869
Taxa named by Edward Drinker Cope